Patriarch Gabriel of Constantinople may refer to:

 Gabriel I of Constantinople, Ecumenical Patriarch in 1596
 Gabriel II of Constantinople, Ecumenical Patriarch in 1657
 Gabriel III of Constantinople, Ecumenical Patriarch in 1702–1707